A unified primary (or top-2 approval+runoff) is an electoral system for narrowing the field of candidates for a single-winner election, similar to a nonpartisan blanket primary, but using approval voting for the first round, advancing the top-two candidates, allowing voters to confirm the majority-supported candidate in the general election.

Comparison to other primary systems 
In the US, most primary elections are party-specific: voters select a political party, either as part of the voter registration process or at the ballot box, and may vote only for candidates sharing that same party affiliation. These primary systems use plurality voting, where each voter may express a preference for one candidate per office. The candidate in each party receiving the most votes advances to the general election. Voters not affiliated with a major political party may or may not be able to participate in these primary elections, depending on jurisdictional rules, and candidates not affiliated with a major political party may be nominated to the general election by other processes such as minor party conventions or petition.

The non-partisan blanket primary (aka "jungle primary" or top-two primary) is a single primary election in which all voters may participate, and all candidates appear on the same ballot, regardless of party affiliation or lack of party affiliation. The top two most-voted candidates (even if members of the same party) will appear in the general election.  This is intended to allow non-partisan voters and candidates to participate, and to allow more moderate nominees in the general election (since voters from both sides of the spectrum can vote for them).  However, the non-partisan blanket primary still only allows voters a single choice per office, and is therefore prone to the spoiler effect, where candidates espousing similar ideologies split votes, helping candidates with opposing ideologies (but fewer candidates) to win.

Like a blanket primary, the unified primary has only one primary election, in which all voters participate, and all candidates appear on a single ballot regardless of political party affiliation. Unlike a blanket primary, the unified primary uses approval voting in the first round, in which voters may express support for any number of favored candidates, which is intended to eliminate vote splitting and spoilers (since voters can support a partisan favorite and a moderate).  The top two most-approved candidates will appear in the general election.

Analysis 

Proponents posit that the Unified Primary system will increase voter choice by allowing all voters to participate equally in all stages of the election process, by allowing voters to express support for more than a single candidate, and by allowing all candidates to compete in a uniform election process, regardless of political party affiliation or lack of affiliation.

In contrast, FairVote, a national election reform non-profit that advocates instant-runoff voting, theorized that it is likely that general election races would have two finalists from the same major party in districts where a majority of voters affiliate with that party, and thereby reduce voter choice in the election that has statistically higher turnout than current primary elections.

Election method simulation of various voting systems indicate that an election system comprising approval voting in the first stage and a vote between the top two approved in the second stage is the highest-performing simple (unranked, unit weighted) two-stage voting system on the criteria of Bayesian regret and propensity to elect the Condorcet winner.  These simulations confirmed early election science research that found that the most efficient simple two-stage voting system allows two or more votes in the first stage and a single vote between two candidates in the second stage.

Unlike single-round Approval voting, the Approval+Runoff method fails independence of clones, because any time the second-most approved candidate wins the runoff, if a clone of the most-approved candidate is introduced, then the runoff will be only between the most-approved candidate and their clone, preventing the second-most approved candidate and any of their clones from winning.

Usage

St. Louis 
The STL Approves campaign sought to adopt the same system (though they refer to it simply as "approval voting") in St. Louis city elections (Mayor, Comptroller, President of the Board of Aldermen, and Alderman).

Originally called St. Louisans for Ranked Choice Voting, the campaign switched to advocating for approval+runoff, primarily due to learning that St. Louis and St. Louis County voting machines are incompatible with IRV.

In April 2020 they gathered enough signatures to qualify for the ballot, Proposition D.  Polling showed more than 70% support for the measure, with majority support among all demographic groups and parties. On election day, the initiative was successfully passed with 68% of the vote, thus becoming the first United States city and jurisdiction to adopt it.

2021 
The first top-two approval primary was held on March 2, 2021, with a 44,571 (22.14%) primary voter turnout. The April 6, 2021 runoff turnout was 57,918 (28.8%). The 2021 St. Louis mayoral election had 4 candidates, three Democrats and one Republican. The average voter supported 1.56 candidates, with the top candidate gaining 57.0%, runner up 46.3%.

In the old closed primary system, there would have been a Democratic party primary with 3 candidates, and a Republican party primary with 1 candidate, with the top Democrat and top Republican advancing to the general election. With Saint Louis being a Democrat-majority city, the top-two approval primary helps two Democrats rise and compete head to head in the runoff, as well as allowing Republican voters a say on which Democrat wins. Democrat candidates have some incentive to present themselves as a moderate to gain Republican votes. Without a party primary Republicans lose access to consolidate under a single candidates, so they must agree on a single candidate before the primary to have any chance of making the top-two.

While voter support for the approval voting ballot measure was high, a majority of the city's aldermen opposed it, and in January 2022, they attempted to repeal it and return to partisan primaries with two or three rounds of runoff voting.  Repealing a voter initiative requires a two-thirds majority of aldermen support, however, and the bills were not passed before another voter initiative, Proposition R, was passed with 69% support, which required that further changes to the voting system to be put to a public vote.

Reform campaigns

Oregon 

The use of approval voting on an open field of all candidates for partisan office as a replacement for current party-nominated primary systems was first publicly proposed in November 2011 by brothers Mark and Jon Frohnmayer in the form of a draft ballot initiative. The text of the failed Oregon Ballot Measure 65 (2008), which would have instituted a top-two primary system, served as the foundation for the draft, which was then modified to allow voters to select as many candidates as favored for each office.

The Frohnmayer brothers are sons of former Oregon public official Dave Frohnmayer, whose plurality loss to Governor Barbara Roberts in Oregon's 1990 gubernatorial election was blamed in part on an independent candidate in the race who siphoned off conservative votes.

A formal petition drive to institute the Unified Primary system in Oregon began in October 2013. Petitioners completed the sponsorship phase of the initiative process by collecting more than 1,000 verified signatures from registered voters to advance the measure toward the November, 2014 ballot.   The term "unified primary" was adopted by petitioners for what they say is etymological accuracy and to distinguish it from other primary system reform initiatives, notably open primary. The pairing "unified primary" was also advanced by Oregon's Attorney General in the draft ballot title for this initiative: "Changes Election Nomination Processes; Replaces Current Primary System With Unified Primary For All Candidates." Several variations of this measure have been filed to date: 2014 Initiative Petitions 38 and 51.

The campaign did not collect the 87,213 signatures required to get Petition 54 onto the ballot.  (The "Open Primary" proposal that used plurality voting did collect enough signatures, but was defeated.)

Seattle 
A 2022 ballot initiative sought to bring this system to Seattle (under the name "approval voting"). In June, volunteers for Seattle Approves had gathered the 26,000 signatures for Initiative 134 to qualify for the November ballot.  The initiative would be an open primary with approval voting, followed by a top-two runoff.  

The city council then had the option to adopt the initiative immediately as an ordinance, put it on the ballot for voters to approve, or reject it and substitute it with a similar measure.  They chose the latter, with Andrew Lewis announcing a bill to put a two-round variant of instant-runoff voting on the ballot to compete against the initiative (under the name "ranked choice voting"), with support from FairVote.  Because Seattle law requires a top-two runoff, this system is actually an instant-runoff primary followed by a top-two runoff.

In the end, the ballot contained two questions, the first of which asked voters if they wanted to change the voting system at all, and the second of which asked voters to support either Approval (1A) or Ranked Choice (1B).  Question 1 narrowly passed, with 51% support, while the more well-known RCV was favored in Question 2, with 76% support.

References 

Electoral systems
Primary elections in the United States